Ballina, an electoral district of the Legislative Assembly in the Australian state of New South Wales, was established in 1894. In 1904 it was abolished and replaced by Byron. It was re-established in 1988, largely replacing Lismore.


Election results

Elections in the 2010s

2019

2015

2011

Elections in the 2000s

2007

2003

Elections in the 1990s

1999

1995

1991

Elections in the 1980s

1988

1904 - 1988
District abolished

Elections in the 1900s

1901

Elections in the 1890s

1898

1895

1894

References

New South Wales state electoral results by district